Michał Matczak (born 14 July 2000 in Wrocław), known professionally as Mata or Skute Bobo, is a Polish rapper, singer and songwriter.

Life 
He is the son of Marcin Matczak, a law professor and Arletta Śliwińska-Matczak, who runs an English language school, both from Sława. In 2019, he passed the international high school diploma at the Stefan Batory Lyceum in Warsaw. During the exams, he presented, inter alia, essay titled "Evolution of language in Polish hip-hop in 2001–2014 based on the work of Jacek Graniecki "Tede"". He received the award of the Varsovian of the Year 2019 in the Warszawiaki plebiscite. The creator of his artistic pseudonym was his father, who invented it during their joint holidays in 2012. He supported his son in entering the music market and advised on the creation of the first song "Klubowe".

Music career

2018–2020: Debut 

In October 2018, he released the concept album Fumar Mata, which was then also released in April 2019 as a mini-album. On 11 December 2019, the music video for his single "Patointeligencja" was published on YouTube via SBM Label record company. Within a few days, the song was listened to almost 10 million times. The content of the song was commented on in the nationwide media, mainly due to the notably explicit lyrics, describing the behaviour of children and young people of affluent background, incl. the use of psychoactive substances, including hard drugs and addiction to them; consumption of alcohol at school, including in class; suicide, unplanned teenage pregnancy and sexual paraphilia. The track caused controversy, meeting with criticism, among others management of Batory High School due to the use of the school image in the music video for the song. In turn, the Alumni Association, in the issued statement, drew attention to the positive aspect of starting a discussion around an important problem in reaction to the work of one of the high school graduates. Mata was appreciated by placing his work in the playlist and on the cover of Tidal Rising Global.

A few days after the publication "Patointeligencja" was used by journalists of the state-owned Polish Television to criticize Polish judges (also Marcin Matczak, the rapper's father, denouncing the government and supporting the judges side in 2015 Polish Constitutional Court crisis and in the ongoing Polish Supreme Court Crisis) in the reportage titled "Rebellion of judge's caste" by Konrad Wąż, aired on 15 December 2019 in the main evening edition of Wiadomości, Poland's chief news program.

On 18 January 2020, Mata released his debut studio album 100 dni do matury, which was certified diamond. The album was met with mixed-to-positive reviews, being reviewed as "decent, with really good moments" and "a successful debut"; although it was also met with less enthusiastic reviews. Critics pointed to the noticeable influence of Taco Hemingway.  In September 2020, he received four statuettes in the hip-hop industry competition Popkillery in categories "Discovery of the year" and "Single of the year". The song "100 dni do matury" was the most listened to single on TIDAL in Poland in 2020, while the album reached number two in the album chart.

2021: Młody Matczak and Skute Bobo 

On 30 March 2021, he released the single "Patoreakcja", in which he expressed his feelings about the chaos that followed the success of "Patointeligencja", including a vulgar response to statements made by, among others, Jacek Kurski, Krystyna Pawłowicz, and Jarosław Jakimowicz regarding him and his father. In the piece, he also leaned towards his own work, both talking about the past and the future. 

In June 2021, he launched a preorder of the album entitled Młody Matczak. Just six hours after the launch of the preorder, the release was purchased in 15 thousand copies, achieving the gold status. On August 16, the SBM label announced on social media that the album had gone platinum. Another single announcing the album was the song "Kiss cam (podryw roku)", which was co-written with Mata by Szymon Frąckowiak, Mikołaj Vargas and Jakub Laszuk. He wrote the song for a girl, which he announced during the Fryderyk Awards 2021. The song turned out to be a number one hit in Poland on Spotify, Apple Music and iTunes. A music video was made for the song, starring Mata, Young Leosia, and Michał Milowicz. On the 7th of July 2021 the single entered the Global 200 Excl. US (tracks from outside the USA) by the Billboard magazine. Mata's song is the first Polish-language song to appear on this list. On 5 August 2021, during the Fryderyk Awards gala, he announced that the song had been certificated diamond.

On 21 August 2021, he released a single of the same name under the pseudonym Skute Bobo. On September 6, he became the first living Polish artist to break the 2 million listener barrier on Spotify.

Młody Matczak was officially released on 1 October 2021, to mixed reviews. In the same month, the McDonald's restaurant chain announced an offer called "zestaw Maty", which was available from 18 October to 21 November 2021. The campaign sparked controversy among both fans of the rapper and enthusiasts of healthy eating and active lifestyles. However, experts from the advertising industry emphasized the marketing value of the campaign and evaluated it mostly positively.

2022–present: Legal accusations and marijuana legalization 
On 27 January 2022, he was arrested by police for possession of 1.5 grams of marijuana. He referred to the incident during Empik's Bestsellers 2021 gala, announcing that he would "fight" for the decriminalization of marijuana. On 21 April 2022, he and Young Leosia have released a single featuring three songs in support of the "#Fundacja420", which fights for the legalization of marijuana in Poland.

On 27 May 2022, Mata released "Patoprohibicja (28.01.2022)", continuing the theme about marijuana and its legalization. On the single he also talks about his arrest on 28 January 2022 for possession of 1.5 grams of the drug. It samples the 2005 song "Policeman" by Jamal.

On 23 May 2022, he played a concert on so-called "schodki" near Warsaw's Vistula. At the concert, he promised to play a second one the next day, which did not happen, because the police arrived at the concert. According to the police, Matczak violated the law on security at mass events, for which he faces up to eight years in prison. Matczak apologized the same day for the situation.

On 13 July 2022, he published a statement declaring that he wanted to become president of Poland in 2040. He announced that by that time he would have released a total of 33 albums, the last in 2033, and would then devote seven years to higher education and apprenticeships in order to acquire the competencies important for the position already in the "New World" so that they would not be obsolete. He said he would like to legalize marijuana. On 14 July, during a concert in Wrocław as part of the Mata Tour, he admitted that the film was not entirely serious.

Discography

Studio albums

EPs

Singles

As lead artist

As featured artist

Other certified songs

Awards and nominations

References 

People from Wrocław
Artists from Warsaw
Polish rappers
Polish songwriters
2000 births
Living people